The Fujifilm GFX series of digital cameras consists of Fujifilm's professional digital cameras aimed at professional photographers. It is part of the larger range of Fujifilm's digital cameras. As of 2021, the GFX series used medium format sensors and Bayer image processor.

Camera models
Fujifilm GFX 50S: The first G-mount camera and the second mirrorless medium format camera by Fujifilm. Announced at Photokina 2016, the camera was available for sale from February 28, 2017.
Fujifilm GFX 50R: Shares the same image sensor, processor and most components of the larger GFX 50S. Announced on September 25, 2018.
Fujifilm GFX100: The flagship model of the GFX series. Unveiled at Photokina in 2018, launched on May 23, 2019, and released in June 2019.
Fujifilm GFX100 IR: Infrared variant of the GFX100. It will be available for special order in Q1 2021.
Fujifilm GFX100S: It is smaller than the GFX100. Unveiled on January 27, 2021.
Fujifilm GFX50S II: The latest model of the GFX series. Announced on September 2, 2021.

GFX camera chronology

Fuji G-mount lenses
All GFX-series cameras with interchangeable lenses use Fujifilm G-mount lenses.

See also
Fujinon
Fujifilm G-mount
Fujifilm X-mount
Fujifilm X series

References

External links
 Official Fujifilm GFX product page

Lens mounts
G-mount